Dominic Daly (1770 – June 5, 1806) was an Irishman who immigrated to America some time around 1800, and was executed for murder, in what has widely been believed to be a miscarriage of justice.

The date of Daly's birth and arrival in the United States has been lost. It is known that he lived and worked in Boston, Massachusetts. In November 1805, the body of a young farmer, Marcus Lyon, was found on the open road near town of Wilbraham, Massachusetts. Daly and a fellow Irishman, James Halligan, were traveling in the area at the time, heading for New Haven, Connecticut, when they were arrested for the murder on November 12, 1805, in Northampton, Massachusetts, for which their captor was paid $500. The pair protested their innocence, but were held in prison for nearly five months, being charged with highway robbery from the assault of Lyon. Despite their long confinement, they were granted defense attorneys only 48 hours before their trial. Once the trial for Commonwealth v. Dominic Daley and James Halligan began, they were convicted within minutes, under such flimsy evidence that one of the defense attorneys was led to declare that it was based simply on outright bigotry.

At their request, the Rev. Jean-Louis Lefebvre de Cheverus, the Catholic bishop of Boston, went at great personal risk to assist them in their last moments. He celebrated a Catholic Mass for them in their prison cell. This is believed to have been the first time a Catholic service had taken place in the town.

The next day, an estimated 15,000 people viewed the execution on June 5, 1806. The two Irishmen publicly forgave their accusers and the prosecutors of the case. They were then hanged.

On St. Patrick's Day 1984, Governor Michael Dukakis of Massachusetts issued a proclamation exonerating Daley and Halligan.

See also
List of wrongful convictions in the United States

References

External links
 The National Registry of Exonerations
 Exoneration profiles at The Innocence Project

1770 births
1806 deaths
18th-century Irish people
19th-century Irish people
Irish emigrants to the United States (before 1923)
People from Boston
Irish people executed abroad
19th-century executions of American people
American people convicted of murder
People convicted of murder by Massachusetts
People executed by Massachusetts by hanging
19th-century executions by the United States
American people executed for murder
Executed Irish people
Burials in Massachusetts
Recipients of American gubernatorial pardons
People wrongfully convicted of murder
Wrongful executions
1805 murders in the United States